Kent Ove Clausen (born 7 November 1985) is a Norwegian cross-country skier.

He made his World Cup debut in March 2008 in Drammen, and collected his first World Cup points with a 22nd place in Trondheim in March 2009. He has only competed in sprint events.

He represents the sports club Steinkjer SK, and lives in Verdal.

Cross-country skiing results
All results are sourced from the International Ski Federation (FIS).

World Cup

Season standings

References

Norwegian male cross-country skiers
People from Verdal
1985 births
Living people
Sportspeople from Trøndelag